JumpStart 2nd Grade (known as Jump Ahead Year 2 in the United Kingdom) is a personal computer game released on 26 March 1996 by Knowledge Adventure. As its name suggests, it was made to teach second grade students. The working title for the game was "JumpStart Adventures 2nd Grade". It was replaced by JumpStart Advanced 2nd Grade in 2002.

Production
The game was announced as being part of the JumpStart Grade School entertainment system on January 13, 1997.

Gameplay and plot
Like the previous JumpStart products, the game takes place in a school setting, but begins after school hours when a giant anthropomorphic frog named C.J. enters the classroom and frees a firefly named Edison. C.J. and Edison (Newton in the United Kingdom) form a double act of sorts with C.J. being an ardent, self-styled "adventurer" while Edison is the more pragmatic straight man, who frequently makes sardonic comments in response to C.J.'s grandiosity. The duo have appeared in many other JumpStart products, such as JumpStart Advanced 2nd Grade; however, their looks and personalities have both undergone enormous changes throughout the years. Edison in the US version has an Irish accent, whereas Newton in the UK version does not.

Reception

MacUser named JumpStart 2nd Grade one of 1996's top 50 CD-ROMs.

References

External links

1996 video games
JumpStart
Children's educational video games
School-themed video games
Windows games
Classic Mac OS games
Video games developed in the United States
Single-player video games